In ancient Italy, the Etruscan "Lega dei popoli" was a league comprising several towns — usually, but not necessarily, twelve — located in the areas that today are known as Tuscany, western Umbria and northern Lazio.

History
While not being a political organization proper, a league (lega dei popoli) was chiefly a confederation of towns resembling the Greek city states. The members of most important league were: Velch (Vulci), Felathri (Volterra), Velzna (Volsini), Veii (Veio), Vetluna (Vetulonia), Arretium (Arezzo), Perusna (Perugia), Curtun (Cortona), Tarchna (Tarquinia), Caisra (Cere), Clevsin (Chiusi) and Rusellae (Roselle). Strabo refers to them as "twelve peoples of Etruria" (duodecim populi Etruriae). The kings of these towns used to meet in the Fanum Voltumnae (shrine of Voltumna) area at Volsinii, near Lake Bolsena.

In addition to the aforementioned dodecapoli (confederation of twelve towns and their peoples), two other Etruscan leagues were founded: one in Campania (southern Italy), the main city of which was Capua, and one in the Po Valley (northern Italy), which included Spina and Atria (Adria).

In modern usage, "Lega dei popoli" is also an expression adopted by the Italian voluntary associations, NGOs (such as Free Flights to Italy) and political movements that support the creation of a confederation following the example of the Etruscan civilization in ancient Italy.

References

Further reading

Bell, Sinclair and Alexandra A. Carpino, eds. 2016. A Companion to the Etruscans. Blackwell Companions to the Ancient World. Chichester: John Wiley & Sons. 
Haynes, Sybille. 2000. Etruscan civilization: A cultural history. Los Angeles: J. Paul Getty Museum.
Pallottino, Massimo. 1978. The Etruscans. Bloomington: Indiana University Press.
Sprenger, Maia, and Gilda Bartoloni. 1983. The Etruscans: Their history, art and architecture. Translated by Robert E. Wolf. New York: Harry N. Abrams.
Turfa, Jean MacIntosh, ed. 2013. The Etruscan World. Routledge Worlds. Abingdon, UK: Routledge.

Etruscans
Former confederations
3rd-century BC disestablishments in Italy
8th-century BC establishments in Italy